The Rome Convention may refer to one of the following conventions:

 Rome Convention of 1980 on contractual obligations
 Rome Convention for the Protection of Performers, Producers of Phonograms and Broadcasting Organisations (1961)
 Rome Convention of 1952 on Damage Caused by Foreign Aircraft to Third Parties on the Surface

See also 
 Treaty of Rome (disambiguation)